The  was a national assembly in early Meiji Japan, established after the Osaka Conference of 1875. It is also referred to as the Senate of Japan,  being the word used to describe the Roman Senate, and other western legislatures named after it.

The Freedom and People's Rights Movement and liberals among the Meiji oligarchy had withdrawn from the Meiji government over their efforts to establish a national assembly with increased representative democracy. The  was only quasi-legislative, in that it had the power to review proposed legislation and make recommendations, but did not have the power to actually initiate any legislation.

The  was replaced by the Imperial Diet in 1890.

Chairman of the Genrōin

References
 Banno, Junji. The Establishment of the Japanese Constitutional System. Routledge (1992). 
 Brunton, Richard. Building Japan 1868-1876. RoutledgeCurzon (1995). 
 Buruma, Ian. Inventing Japan: 1853-1964. Modern Library; Reprint edition (2004) 
 Sims, Richard. Japanese Political History Since the Meiji Renovation 1868-2000. Palgrave Macmillan. 

Defunct upper houses
Politics of the Empire of Japan
Japanese parliaments
Japanese words and phrases